Alcanhões is a town and administrative parish in Santarém, Portugal. The population in 2011 was 1,469, in an area of 11.45 km².

References

Towns in Portugal
Freguesias of Santarém, Portugal